Meall Tairneachan (787 m) is a mountain in the Grampian Mountains of Scotland, located northwest of Aberfeldy in Perthshire.

The peak lies in an area of rocky and rolling moors between Loch Tummel and Aberfeldy. A baryte mine is located close to its summit.

References

Mountains and hills of Perth and Kinross
Marilyns of Scotland
Corbetts